Holly Hibbott (born 13 December 1999) is a British swimmer. She competed in the women's 400 metre freestyle event at the 2017 World Aquatics Championships. At the 2018 Commonwealth Games, she won silver in the 400 metre freestyle and bronze in the 4×200 m freestyle relay events.

References

External links
 
 

1999 births
Living people
English female swimmers
Place of birth missing (living people)
Swimmers at the 2018 Commonwealth Games
Commonwealth Games silver medallists for England
Commonwealth Games bronze medallists for England
Commonwealth Games medallists in swimming
British female freestyle swimmers
European Aquatics Championships medalists in swimming
Swimmers at the 2015 European Games
European Games medalists in swimming
European Games gold medalists for Great Britain
European Games bronze medalists for Great Britain
Swimmers at the 2022 Commonwealth Games
Commonwealth Games competitors for England
21st-century British women
Sportspeople from Southport
Medallists at the 2018 Commonwealth Games